Douglas Lawrence Osowski, known professionally as Mr. Lawrence, is an American voice actor, animator, storyboard artist, writer,  director, and comedian. He is best known for his work as a writer and voice actor for the Nicktoons Rocko's Modern Life and SpongeBob SquarePants. On SpongeBob, he has provided the voice of Plankton and various recurring characters since 1999.

Career
Lawrence is known for his work as a writer (and, since season 10, story editor) on the animated TV series SpongeBob SquarePants. He also has long-running character roles on the show, providing the voice of Sheldon Plankton and various recurring characters, such as Potty the Parrot (replacing Paul Tibbitt from season 10 onwards), the Realistic Fish-Head, and Larry the Lobster.

He was the voice of Edward T. Platypus, Nurse Leslie, Dave, and Ping-Pong on Camp Lazlo. Lawrence also performed the voice of Filburt in Rocko's Modern Life and is the voice of the Announcer and Manant in The Aquabats! Super Show!. Lawrence is a standup comedian, cartoonist, writer-director, animator and producer on the television series Johnny Talk. He worked on The Ren and Stimpy Show in its second season as a layout assistant. He also worked as a writer on Rocko's Modern Life, The Twisted Whiskers Show, and Mighty Magiswords.

As a comedian, Lawrence performed in New Jersey and Los Angeles, collaborating with comedian Jeremy Kramer and Boston comedy writer Martin Olson. Jeff "Swampy" Marsh, a storyboard writer for Rocko's Modern Life and co-creator of Phineas and Ferb, described Lawrence as bearing a "unique sense of humor", and that one "would really have to know Doug to understand (or not understand)" his style. Marsh says that the rationale for Lawrence's humor techniques and decisions "remain a mystery to us forever."

Filmography

Films and television shows

Video games

Writer
 Rocko's Modern Life (1993–96)
 The Twisted Tales of Felix the Cat (1995–97)
 SpongeBob SquarePants (1999–2002; 2009–present) - also story editor (2016–present)
 Hairballs (2000)
 Do the Voice (2003)
 Johnnie Talk (2003)
 SpongeBob's Truth or Square (2009)
 The Haunted World of El Superbeasto (2009) – Additional screenplay material
 The Twisted Whiskers Show (2010)
 Lucky Lady (2014)
 Mighty Magiswords (2015–2016) - Story
 Wabbit (2015)
 Rocko's Modern Life: Static Cling (2019)

Director
 Looks Can Kill (1994)
 Rocko's Modern Life (1993–1996) – Leap Frogs/Bedfellows (1993) - Sugar-Frosted Frights/Ed Is Dead: A Thriller! (1995) – Fish-N-Chumps/Camera Shy (1995) – Nothing to Sneeze At/Old Fogey Froggy (1995) – Speaking Terms/Tooth and Nail (1995)
 The Twisted Tales of Felix the Cat (1995–97)
 General Chaos: Uncensored Animation (1998)
 Hairballs (2000)
 The Haunted World of El Superbeasto (2009) – Assistant director
 "Lucky Lady" (2014)

Other work

 The Food Album (1993) – album art

Awards and nominations

References

External links

 

Living people
American male video game actors
American male voice actors
American male television actors
20th-century American male actors
21st-century American male actors
People from East Brunswick, New Jersey
Year of birth missing (living people)